George Smith Catlin (August 24, 1808 – December 26, 1851) was a U.S. Representative from Connecticut.

Born in Harwinton, Connecticut, Catlin attended the common schools, Amherst (Massachusetts) College, and the Litchfield (Connecticut) Law School. He was admitted to the bar in 1828 and practiced in Windham, Connecticut, from 1829 to 1851. He served as member of the Connecticut House of Representatives in 1831 and again in 1846, and was also secretary to the Governor from 1831 to 1833. From 1842 to 1843, he served as prosecuting attorney for Windham County.

Catlin was elected as a Democrat to the Twenty-eighth Congress (March 4, 1843 – March 3, 1845). He was an unsuccessful Democratic candidate for Governor of Connecticut in 1848, but served in the Connecticut State Senate in 1850, and as judge of the Windham County Court in 1850 and 1851.

He died in Windham, Connecticut, on December 26, 1851, and was interred in Windham Cemetery.

References

1808 births
1851 deaths
Democratic Party members of the Connecticut House of Representatives
Democratic Party Connecticut state senators
Connecticut state court judges
Democratic Party members of the United States House of Representatives from Connecticut
19th-century American politicians
People from Harwinton, Connecticut
Burials at Windham Cemetery
19th-century American judges